The 1915 Oklahoma Sooners football team was an American football team that represented the University of Oklahoma in the Southwest Conference during the 1915 college football season. In their 11th year under head coach Bennie Owen, the Sooners compiled a 10–0 record (3–0 against conference opponents), won the Southwest Conference championship, and outscored their opponents by a combined total of 370 to 54. This was the first season that the Sooners participated in the Southwest Conference.  

There was no contemporaneous system in 1915 for determining a national champion. However, Oklahoma was retroactively named as the national champion by the Billingsley Report using its alternate "margin of victory" methodology.

Fullback Forest Geyer was recognized as an All-American. Geyer was inducted into the College Football Hall of Fame in 1973.

Six Sooners received All-Southwest Conference honors: Elmer Capshaw, Forest Geyer, Oliver Hot, Willis Hott, Hap Johnson, and Homer Montgomery.

Schedule

References

Oklahoma
Oklahoma Sooners football seasons
Southwest Conference football champion seasons
College football undefeated seasons
College football national champions
Oklahoma Sooners football